A statue of Enrique González Martínez is installed along the Rotonda de los Jaliscienses Ilustres, in Centro, Guadalajara, in the Mexican state of Jalisco. The statue was unveiled on the 100th anniversary of his birthday, on 13 April 1971.

References

External links

 

1971 establishments in Mexico
1971 sculptures
Outdoor sculptures in Guadalajara
Rotonda de los Jaliscienses Ilustres
Sculptures of men in Mexico
Statues in Jalisco